Porus or Poros (326–321 BC) was an ancient Indian king whose territory spanned the region between the Jhelum River (Hydaspes) and Chenab River (Acesines), in the Punjab region of the Indian subcontinent. He is only mentioned in Greek sources.

Credited to have been a legendary warrior with exceptional skills, Porus unsuccessfully fought against Alexander the Great in the Battle of the Hydaspes (326 BC). In the aftermath, an impressed Alexander not only reinstated him as his satrap but also granted him dominion over lands to the south-east extending as far as the Hyphasis (Beas). Porus reportedly died sometime between 321 and 315 BC.

Sources
The only contemporary information available on Porus and his kingdom is from Greek sources, whereas Indian sources do not mention him. These Greek sources differ considerably among themselves.

Identification

Purus 
Michael Witzel conjectures that Porus was a king of the Pūrus, who existed as a marginal power in Punjab after their defeat in the Battle of the Ten Kings notwithstanding (probable) political realignment with the Bharatas. Hem Chandra Raychaudhuri largely agreed with this identification.

Sourasenis 
Multiple histories — Indica by Arrian, Geographica by Strabo, and Bibliotheca historica by Diodorus Siculus — mention that Megasthenes described an Indian tribe called Sourasenoi: they worshiped one "Herakles" and originated from a land having a city named Mathura and a river named Yamuna. The Greeks often chronicled foreign gods in terms of their own divinities; thus multiple scholars have understood "Herakles" to mean "Hari-Krishna". Given that Quintus Curtius Rufus mentions Porus' vanguard soldiers  carried a banner of "Heracles" during the face-off with Alexander, Ishwari Prasad argues that Porus was a Shurasena.

However, the identification with "Hari-Krishna" is not well-settled; there is no evidence of Krishna worship as early as 4th century BC. Modern scholars increasingly equate "Herakles" to Indra but  this identification is not widely accepted either.

Miscellaneous 
H. C. Seth had identified Porus with Parvataka, a king mentioned in the Sanskrit play Mudrarakshasa, the Jain text Parishishtaparvan, and other sources including the royal genealogies of Nepal. However, there is little evidence to support this: Parishishtaparvan assigns him the territory of Himavatkuta while Greek sources have Porus rule in the present-day Punjab region, and Mudrarakshasa attributes his death to poisoning planned by Chanakya, while Greek sources state that Porus was killed by Eudemus (or Alexander, himself).

Rule

Background 
Porus ruled over the tracts between the rivers Hydaspes (Jhelum) and Acesines (Chenab); Strabo noted that the territory contained almost 300 cities. He had a hostile relationship with the neighboring polity of Taxila, having assassinated their erstwhile ruler Ambhiraj, his maternal uncle.

Porus's nephew, also called Porus in Greek sources, ruled a territory between the Irāvatī (Hydraōtēs) and Asikni (Akesinēs) rivers.

When the armies of Alexander crossed the Indus in their eastward migration, probably in Udabhandapura, he was greeted by the then-ruler of Taxila, Omphis/Ambhi, son of Ambhiraj. Omphis had visited Alexander in Sogdiana and was treated as an ally; his rule was confirmed and gifts lavished on him, but a Macedonian satrap was installed. Omphis hoped to force both Porus and Abisares into submission, leveraging the might of Alexander's forces, and dispatched diplomatic missions to this effect. In response, Abisares offered submission but Porus refused, leading Alexander to seek a face-off on the bank of Jhelum. Thus began the Battle of the Hydaspes in 326 BC; the exact site remains unknown and the exact strength of the armies cannot be determined either, due to major discrepancies between sources.

Battle of the Hydaspes 

Alexander re-used the same vessels which were used for crossing the Indus, some 300 km away at Udabhandapura. Small-scale attempts at intrusion were frequently mounted by Alexander's forces and even before the battle had started, skirmishes were reported in riverine islands.

Alexander eventually decided to accompany a strike force across the densely forested headlands; the base camp with substantial cavalry and infantry units was left under Craterus, to follow upon a successful passage, whilst the remaining forces were distributed along the river under three phalanx officers to distract Porus' forces. The strategy was successful and they crossed the Jhelum unobstructed, on a stormy night, just before dawn. A band of horsemen on chariots led by Porus' son did detect the intrusion and mount a charge but was repelled by Alexander's superior cavalry.

Informed of Alexander's passage, Porus became concerned with tackling those who had already crossed, rather than preventing passage of the remaining majority. He took a defensive position in the plains, interspersing infantry units with elephants on the front lines and stationing the cavalry and chariots in the wings. Alexander chose to shield his infantry and instead led a devastating cavalry charge on Porus' left wing, forcing reinforcements from the right; however, this rear-transit came under attack by Coenus' cavalry and Porus' cavalry was compelled to take refuge within the infantry frontlines, causing confusion.

This led to an all-out attack from both sides, but Porus' plans proved futile. According to Heckle (2014), Porus is believed to have had around 30,000 infantry. However, Porus only had 4,000 mounted troops. Not only were Porus' cavalry charges repelled but the mahouts were assassinated using sarissa and the elephants were pushed back into Porus' columns, wreaking havoc on the rear, Alexander's cavalry kept charging and inflicting disorder. Soon Porus' army was surrounded  on all sides, and became easy fodder for Alexander's forces with the cavalry exterminated and most of the elephants captured. Still, Porus refused to surrender and wandered about atop an elephant, until he was wounded and his force routed. A fraction of the infantry successfully escaped and probably planned to regroup but Craterus pursued them to their deaths.

Result 

The battle resulted in a decisive Greek victory; however, A. B. Bosworth warns against an uncritical reading of Greek sources, who obviously exaggerated. Alexander held athletic and gymnastic games at the site, and even commissioned two cities in commemoration: Nicaea at the site of his victory and Bucephalous at the battle-ground, in memory of his horse. Later, decadrachms were minted by the Babylonian mint depicting Alexander on horseback, armed with a sarissa and attacking a pair of Indians atop an elephant.

Aftermath
Despite the apparently one-sided results, Alexander was impressed by Porus and chose not to depose him. His territory was not only reinstated, but also expanded, with Alexander's forces annexing the territories of Glausaes, who ruled to the northeast of Porus' kingdom. Further, Omphis was reconciled with Porus.

A joint expedition was then mounted against a territory east of Chenab, ruled by an enemy cousin of Porus; he had earlier submitted to Alexander but, suspicious of Porus' rise in rank, chose to flee with his army. The date of this battle remains disputed; Alexander's forces overran his lands before meeting stiff resistance at a walled Sangala on the other side of Ravi. Siege warfare was executed to brilliant effect and the full-fledged attack began once Porus had joined with his elephants. As Sangala and allied cities were razed, Porus was allowed to station his garrisons.

Thereafter, Alexander proceeded unopposed to Beas and even intended to cross it towards mainland India; however, the monsoon was at its peak and his weary troops remained stubborn despite his cajoling and threats. A reluctant Alexander had to renounce his plans and turn back. Porus was thus ratified as the de facto ruler of the entire territory east of Jhelum, with no European satrap to co-rule with, unlike Ambhi and Abisares. The crossing-back of the Jhelum was a prolonged affair; filled with festivities, it attracted thousands.

Death

After Alexander's death in 323 BC, Perdiccas became the regent of his empire, and after Perdiccas's murder in 321 BC, Antipater became the new regent. According to Diodorus, Antipater recognized Porus's authority over the territories along the Indus River. However, Eudemus, who had served as Alexander's satrap in the Punjab region, treacherously killed Porus.

Cultural depictions of Porus 

 Sohrab Modi portrayed as Porus in Sikandar movie in 1941
 Prithviraj Kapoor portrayed as Porus in movie Sikandar-e-Azam in 1965.
 Porus is played by Arun Bali in the 1991 Chanakya.
 Porus appears in the 1999 animated series Reign: The Conqueror
 Porus is portrayed by the Thai actor, Bin Bunluerit, in Alexander (2004)
 Porus appears in the 2011 Chandragupta Maurya.
 SET launched Siddharth Kumar Tewary's serial titled Porus on the Battle of Hydaspes in Nov 2017, in which Porus is portrayed by Laksh Lalwani.
 Porus appears in the Historical Battle campaign of Rome: Total War: Alexander.
 Porus appears in the video game Ancient Battle: Alexander, in which he is a playable character, as well as an enemy.

See also
 Indian campaign of Alexander the Great
 Taxiles
 Abisares
 Cleophis
 Pauravas

Notes

References

Citations

Sources

Further reading

 
 Lendring, Jona. Alexander de Grote - De ondergang van het Perzische rijk (Alexander the Great. The demise of the Persian empire), Amsterdam: Athenaeum - Polak & Van Gennep, 2004.  
 Holt, Frank L. Alexander the Great and the Mystery of the Elephant Medallions, California: University of California Press, 2003, 217pgs.

External links
 

317 BC deaths
Satraps of the Alexandrian Empire
History of Punjab
4th-century BC Indian monarchs
Year of birth unknown
Yadava kingdoms